Guasdualito is a city and episcopal see in the landlocked Apure State, in southern Venezuela.

Description 
The city is the capital of Páez Municipality, in the Distrito Especial Alto Apure.
 
It has an important location on the border between Venezuela and the city of Arauca in Colombia for commerce, as well as being the main petroleum center in the region.

It has a population of approximately 100,000 inhabitants per 2014.

Religion 
The Our Lady of Mount Carmel Cathedral (Catedral Nuestra Señora del Carmen) is dedicated to the Virgin of Mercy and is the cathedral episcopal see of the Roman Catholic Diocese of Guasdualito since December 2015.

 
Cities in Apure